State Route 63 (SR 63) is a north–south state highway in the U.S. state of California in the Central Valley. State Route 63 runs concurrent with Route 198 within Visalia.

Route description

SR 63 begins in the city of Tulare at an intersection with SR 137. It travels due north as Mooney Boulevard before leaving the Tulare city limits. The highway soon enters Visalia, intersecting CR J30 and passing through to the SR 198 freeway, where SR 63 merges with the freeway heading eastbound until the next exit. Following this, SR 63 turns north as a one-way couplet with Locust Street for southbound traffic and Court Street for northbound traffic. SR 63 intersects with CR J32 in downtown Visalia before turning northwest on NW 2nd Avenue and NW 3rd Avenue. North of downtown, NW 2nd Avenue and NW 3rd Avenue merge and become Dinuba Boulevard, and SR 63 continues north out of Visalia.

SR 63 continues north as Road 124, intersecting CR J34 and passing by Sequoia Field Airport. The road makes a small bend to the east, running concurrently with SR 201 briefly as Road 128 in the town of Calgro. SR 63 continues through Cutler and Orosi before intersecting CR J19 and traveling west on Avenue 460 for two blocks before continuing north at the city of Orange Cove as Hills Valley Road. After a few curves in the road, SR 63 ends at SR 180.

SR 63 is part of the California Freeway and Expressway System, and south of the northern Visalia city limits is part of the National Highway System, a network of highways that are considered essential to the country's economy, defense, and mobility by the Federal Highway Administration.

Major intersections

See also

References

External links

California @ AARoads.com - State Route 63
Caltrans: Route 63 highway conditions
California Highways: Route 63

063
State Route 063
State Route 063
Streets in Visalia, California